Aizawl FC is an Indian professional football club based in Aizawl, Mizoram, that competes in the I-League. Incorporated in 1984, the club earned the entry in India's top-tier league in 2015–16, after winning 2015 I-League 2nd Division. Nicknamed "the people's club", Aizawl became first football club from the Northeast to win a top flight Indian football league. The club also competes in the Mizoram Premier League.

History
Aizawl FC was founded in 1984 in Aizawl, the capital of the Indian state of Mizoram and have since participated in various amateur tournaments. The club is affiliated with Mizoram Football Association (MFA) and is under the ownership of Robert Romawia Royte.

In January 2012, they were officially certified by the All India Football Federation (AIFF) to participate in the I-League 2nd Division, then second tier of football league system in the country. This move would begin a new chapter for Aizawl Football Club as they would officially become professional.

In September 2012, they participated in 2012 Indian Federation Cup Qualifiers. Finally, the team qualified for I-League 2nd Division after its second attempt. In 2013, Aizawl reached the final of Bordoloi Trophy, but lost 1–0 to Bhawanipore. In 2015, they won the 2015 I-League 2nd Division, defeating Chanmari FC 4–2 in the final match. Thus they granted permission to participate in India's top-tier football tournament I-League in 2015–16 I-League, the first team from Mizoram to do so. The club also clinched the 2015–16 Indian Federation Cup title.

On 20 December 2016, Khalid Jamil was announced as the head coach of the first team for 2016–17 I-League. On 30 April 2017, Aizawl won the 2016–17 I-League, topping the league table with 37 points from 18 games. Aizawl became the first team from the north-east to win the top flight of Indian football. In the 2017–18 I-League season, Aizawl finished the league on the 5th position, garnering 24 points from 18 games. Aizawl has also participated in the 2018 Indian Super Cup and reached the quarter-finals. In January 2019, Aizawl announced Stanley Rozario as their new head coach, and ended their 2018–19 I-League season on the 7th spot on the table, with 24 points from 20 games. In the next season, Aizawl garnered 16 points from 15 games, with 5 games left in hand. On 18 April 2020, the All India Football Federation, the organising body of the league announced the cancellation of the remaining matches due to the COVID-19 pandemic.

Due to COVID-19 pandemic, 2020–21 I-League season's format was shortened. All teams faced each other once in the first leg of the league. The league was then divided into two different groups. According to points table from first leg, top six teams faced each other once again in the Championship stage. The rest of the five teams played against each other in the Relegation stage. Aizawl ended the first phase of the season at the 7th position, with 15 points from 10 games. Aizawl couldn't qualify for the Championship stage, and hence were put in the Relegation stage. Aizawl topped the stage, with 24 points from 14 games. For the 2021–22 I-League, Aizawl roped in Yan Law as their new head coach and finished the season on eighth place in league table.

Crest and colours

While the team colours are red and white, the club's official crest shows the Christian cross (Latin) atop of the map of Mizoram, which is on a soccer ball in the middle.

Stadiums

Rajiv Gandhi Stadium

Aizawal FC plays its home matches at the Rajiv Gandhi Stadium, located in Salem Veng, Aizawl. It has artificial turf and has a capacity of 20,000 spectators. It hosted the home games of Aizawl in both the I-League and Mizoram Premier League.

Lammual AstroTurf Stadium

Until 2015, Aizawl FC used Lammual AstroTurf Stadium as their home ground for matches of Mizoram Premier League, which is a single tier stadium and has a seating capacity of 5,000 spectators.

Kit manufacturers and shirt sponsors

Support and rivalry

Supporters
The core of Aizawl fans consists of the Red Army. They were among the first who brought the ultras movement in India. Large banners, flags and megaphones are their main characteristics.
The Rajiv Gandhi Stadium has seen an average attendance of 20,000.

Rivalries

Northeast India Derby

Aizawl FC has rivalries with its fellow northeastern clubs in the I-League including NEROCA, TRAU FC, and earlier Shillong Lajong.

Mizoram Derby
In the regional championships including Mizoram Premier League and MFA Super Cup, the club also nurture rivalries with local sides Chhinga Veng FC, and Chanmari FC.

Players

First-team players

Team records

Season-by-season

Key
Attendance = Average league attendance

Overall records

Continental statistics

Personnel

Current technical staff

Managerial record
Information correct after match played on 5 March 2022. Only competitive matches are counted.

Notable players

Past and present internationals

The players below have senior/youth international cap(s) for their respective countries. Players whose name is listed, represented their countries before or after playing for Aizawl FC.

Asia 

 Mahmoud Al Amnah (2017)
 Masih Saighani (2017–2018)
 Bektur Talgat Uulu (2018)
 Abhishek Rijal (2021)
  Bakhtior Kalandarov (2022)

Africa 
 Joseph Adjei (2019–2020)
 Abdoulaye Kanouté (2019–2020)
 Amadou Alou Sissoko (2019–2020)
 Richard Kasagga (2019–2021)
 Henry Kisekka (2022–)

Europe 
 Andrei Ionescu (2017–2018)

South America 
 Enzo Prono Zelaya (2018)
 Willis Plaza (2021–2022)
 Robert Primus (2022)

Honours

League
 I-League
Champions (1): 2016–17
I-League 2nd Division
Champions (1): 2015
Mizoram Premier League
Champions (3): 2014–15, 2015–16, 2018–19, 2019–20
 Runners-up (1): 2017–18

Cup
Federation Cup
Runners-up (1): 2015–16
Bordoloi Trophy
Runners-up (1): 2013
MFA Super Cup
Champions (1): 2016
Runners-up (1): 2015
Mizoram Independence Cup
Runners-up (1): 2018

Continental (AFC)
AFC Champions League
Play-off round (1): 2018
AFC Cup
Group stage (1): 2018

Continental record

See also
List of football clubs in Mizoram

References

Bibliography

External links

Team profile at Global Sports Archive
Team profile at the-aiff.com (AIFF)
Team archive at worldfootball.net

 
Football clubs in Mizoram
Association football clubs established in 1984
1984 establishments in Mizoram
I-League 2nd Division clubs
I-League clubs